Lazar Jovanović may refer to:

Lazar Jovanović (sport shooter) (born 1904), Yugoslav sports shooter
Lazar Jovanović (writer) (fl. 1835–1853), Serb manuscript writer from Ottoman Bosnia
Lazar Jovanović (footballer) (born 1993), Serbian football player